The Shinekhudag Formation (also known as Shinekhudug Formation, Shinekhudag or Shinekhudukskaya Svita) is a geological formation in Dundgov, Mongolia whose strata date back to the Early Cretaceous. Dinosaur remains have been recovered from it. It has formerly been considered Aptian-Albian in age, but more recent research suggests an earlier Berriasian-Hauterivian age.

Vertebrate paleofauna

Dinosaurs

See also 
 List of dinosaur-bearing rock formations

References

Lower Cretaceous Series of Asia

Berriasian Stage
Valanginian Stage